Earl Buford was an American longtime Pittsburgh Police leader, who served as Pittsburgh Police Chief from June 15, 1992 until December 29, 1995.

In August 1989, he was promoted to Assistant Chief overseeing the drug and vice sections.

See also

 Police chief
 Allegheny County Sheriff
 List of law enforcement agencies in Pennsylvania

References

External links
Reading Eagle - Google News Archive Search

Chiefs of the Pittsburgh Bureau of Police
Year of birth missing
Year of death missing